Benjamin Bridge is a place in the Canadian province of Nova Scotia, located in Kings County. It is located between the communities of Gaspereau and White Rock.

References
  Benjamin Bridge on Destination Nova Scotia

Communities in Kings County, Nova Scotia
General Service Areas in Nova Scotia